State Highway 55 (SH 55) is a State Highway in Kerala, India that starts in Cherkala and ends in Panjikal. The highway is 39.1 km long.

The Route Map 
Cherkala junction (Km 58/0 of NH 17) – Mulleria – Adhur – Kotyadi - Panjikal

See also 
Roads in Kerala
List of State Highways in Kerala

References 

State Highways in Kerala
Roads in Kasaragod district